Table of Atlanta neighborhoods with over 500 population

See also
Geography of Atlanta
Neighborhoods of Atlanta

References
Source: 2010 U.S. census figures as tabulated by WalkScore